United Nations Security Council Resolution 1670, adopted unanimously on April 13, 2006, after reaffirming all resolutions on the situation between Eritrea and Ethiopia, particularly resolutions 1640 (2005) and 1661 (2006), the Council extended the mandate of the United Nations Mission in Ethiopia and Eritrea (UNMEE) for a period of one month until May 15, 2006.

Resolution

Observations
The Security Council reaffirmed its support for the peace process between the two countries and the full implementation of the Algiers Agreement. It stressed that peace in the region could not be achieved without the full demarcation of the mutual border between Eritrea and Ethiopia.

Council members also reaffirmed their commitment to ensure that both parties permitted UNMEE to work freely and provide necessary access, assistance, support and protection during the course of its mandate; the demarcation of the border could not take place without UNMEE's freedom of movement, which had been under "unacceptable restriction".

Acts
Extending UNMEE's mandate for a period of one month as a matter of technicality pending further discussions on its future,  the Council demanded that Ethiopia and Eritrea fully comply with Resolution 1640. Member States were called upon to provide contributions to a trust fund established by Resolution 1177 (1998) and support for UNMEE.

The resolution noted that if the parties had not fully complied with Resolution 1640 by May 2006, the Council would review the status of UNMEE, including the transformation to an observer mission.

See also
 Badme
 Eritrean–Ethiopian War
 List of United Nations Security Council Resolutions 1601 to 1700 (2005–2006)

References

External links
 
Text of the Resolution at undocs.org

 1670
2006 in Eritrea
2006 in Ethiopia
 1670
 1670
Eritrea–Ethiopia border
April 2006 events